Fake fur is any material designed to resemble fur.

Fake fur may also refer to:

 Fake Fur (album), an album by the Japanese rock band Spitz
 Fake Fur (manga), a Japanese manga by Satomi Yamagata
 Tiger Fake Fur, a pseudonym of Makoto Kawamoto